Serapion was a Patriarch of Antioch (191–211). He is known primarily through his theological writings, although all but a few fragments of his works have perished. His feast day is celebrated on October 30.

Serapion was considered one of the chief theologians of his era.
Eusebius refers to three works of Serapion in his history, but admits that others probably existed: first is a private letter addressed to Caricus and Pontius against Montanism, from which Eusebius quotes an extract (Historia ecclesiastica V, 19), as well as ascriptions showing that it was circulated amongst bishops in Asia and Thrace; next is a work addressed to a certain Domninus, who in time of persecution abandoned Christianity for the error of "Jewish will-worship" (Hist. Eccles, VI, 12).

Lastly, Eusebius quotes (vi.12.2) from a pamphlet Serapion wrote concerning the Docetic Gospel of Peter, in which Serapion presents an argument to the Christian community of Rhossus in Syria against this gospel and condemns it.

Eusebius also alludes to a number of personal letters Serapion wrote to Pontius, Caricus, and others about this Gospel of Peter.

Serapion also acted (Pantaenus supported him) against the influence of Gnosticism in Osroene by consecrating Palut as bishop of Edessa, where Palut addressed the increasingly Gnostic tendencies that the churchman Bardesanes was introducing to its Christian community. He ordained Pantaenus as a Priest or Bishop in Edessa.

Serapion was succeeded as bishop of Antioch by Asclepiades (Eusebius Historia ecclesiastica VI, 11, 4).

References

External links
 Early Christian Writings: Fragments of Serapion of Antioch

211 deaths
Patriarchs of Antioch
Christian anti-Gnosticism
2nd-century archbishops
3rd-century archbishops
3rd-century Christian saints
Year of birth unknown